Run Wild. Live Free. Love Strong.,  stylized as RUN WILD. LIVE FREE. LOVE STRONG., is the second album from for King & Country. Fervent Records alongside Word Records released the project on September 16, 2014. For King & Country worked with producers Ben Glover, Matt Hales, Seth Mosley, and Tedd Tjornhom in the creation of this album. 5 tracks from the album became radio singles including "Fix My Eyes", "Shoulders", "It's Not Over Yet", "Priceless", and "O God Forgive Us." The new version of the last song was originally not the one featured on the album as it was a new recording that features Christian hip hop and rap artist KB, however it was subsequently added to the album.

Reception

Signaling in a four star out of five review by CCM Magazine, Matt Conner recognizes, "Capitalizing on that momentum, Run Wild. Live Free. Love Strong. doesn’t disappoint."" Michael Weaver, agrees it is a four-star album from Jesus Freak Hideout, responding, "for King & Country have offered up a triumphant return with Run Wild. Live Free. Love Strong.... Run Wild. Live Free. Love Strong. hits all the marks and leaves very little you can't be satisfied with. Without a doubt, Joel and Luke have avoided any semblance of a sophomore slump. Contemporary and pop fans alike should find enjoyment in this record, but it honestly reaches further than that." Indicating in a ten out of ten review from Cross Rhythms, Stephen Curry replies, "This new offering covers topics from recovering from past mistakes, having big dreams, keeping our allegiance to Christ and our importance to God and they are all delivered with stunning energy and catchy melodies... This duo have crafted a masterful pop album." Marcus Hathcock, agrees it is a perfect five out of five stars by New Release Tuesday, declaring, "Album of the year. Incredible songwriting. Raw-yet-polished, painful-but-victorious, resting-but-driven anthems that are single handedly moving Christian music forward. Rare, seamless marriage of conventional instruments and electronic elements that don't come off as trend-following or out of place." Awarding the album four and a half stars at 365 Days of Inspiring Media, Emily Kjonaas writes, "RUN WILD. LIVE FREE. LOVE STRONG., they prove that they are a force to be reckoned with." Aubrey Wickenheiser, rating the album five stars for Louder Than the Music, says, "they've really settled into their identity as artists." Rating the album a 4.3 out of five at Christian Music Review, Jay Heilman writes, "Run Wild. Live Free. Love Strong. will be one of those records that you will want to reach for not only for entertainment, but encouragement from the Word in the form of song." Jessica Morris, awarding the album ten stars for Jesus Wired, says, "Musically, this album is bold enough to weave different sounds and genres together in a unique and beautiful way; and lyrically it communicates the simple truths of humanity: we hurt, but there is hope in Christ." Writing a review for Christian Review Magazine, Leah St. John rating the album five stars describes, "RUN WILD. LIVE FREE. LOVE STRONG is sure capture and impress a large audience with its wonderful lyrics, vocals, and musical style."

Run Wild. Live Free. Love Strong. won the Best Contemporary Christian Music Album at the 57th Annual Grammy Awards.

Track listing
Mastered by Ted Jensen at Sterling Sound, NYC

Note
 An anniversary, deluxe edition was released in 2015 that replaced "It's Not Over Yet" with "Its Not Over Yet (The Encore)" and replaced "O God Forgive" with a version of the song featuring KB. The new tracks included are "Priceless", "Ceasefire", and "Wholehearted".

Charts

Weekly charts

Decade-end charts

Certifications

References

External links 
 Allmusic

2014 albums
For King & Country (band) albums
Fervent Records albums
Word Records albums